The Archdeacon of Drumcliffe was a senior ecclesiastical officer within the Diocese of Drumcliffe. They held office between the 10th and the 13th centuries.

References

Archdeacons of Drumcliffe
Lists of Anglican archdeacons in Ireland
Religion in County Sligo